KKR may refer to:

Kohlberg Kravis Roberts, a global investment firm
Kolkata Knight Riders, an Indian Premier League franchise
Korringa–Kohn–Rostoker method, a method used in electronic band structure calculations
Kir-Balar language, an Afro-Asiatic language

See also